According to IUPAC definition, self-diffusion coefficient is the diffusion coefficient  of species  when the chemical potential gradient equals zero. It is linked to the diffusion coefficient  by the equation:

This term is commonly assumed to be equal to the tracer diffusion determined by watching the movement of an isotope in the material of interest.

See also 

 Brownian motion
 Diffusion
 Molecular diffusion

References

Diffusion